Grace Preparatory Academy of Durango was a private, college-preparatory Christian school located in Durango, Colorado, United States. Founded in 2001, it offered programs for seventh through twelfth grade students. It had been a member of the National Association of University-Model Schools since 2006 and was a member of the Association of Christian Schools International.

Educational model
Grace Preparatory Academy of Durango adhered to the educational model known as the University-Model School® (UMS) which combines two elements of educational success, the professional classroom instruction of a teacher and the at-home mentoring of a parent, into a unified, college-like program. Students attended classes on campus two days per week, and instruction continued at home on the other days.

References

External links

 

2001 establishments in Colorado
Christian schools in Colorado
Educational institutions established in 2001
Private middle schools in Colorado